Kwon Chang-hoon (born 30 June 1994) is a South Korean professional footballer who plays as an attacking midfielder for Gimcheon Sangmu and the South Korea national team.

Early life
Kwon started playing football when he was in YangJeon Elementary School in Seoul. After he graduated from Joongdong Middle School, he went to Maetan High School to join the under-18 team of Suwon Samsung Bluewings.

Club career

Suwon Samsung Bluewings

Suwon Samsung Bluewings signed Kwon under homegrown player rule during the 2012 K League draft. He made his senior debut as a substitute in the 79th minute in an AFC Champions League match against Kashiwa Reysol on 3 April 2013. He also made his K League debut against Daegu FC on 6 April, playing as a substitute for 25 minutes. He was selected for the K League 1 Best XI in 2015 and 2016 while playing for Suwon. He challenged France's Ligue 1 after growing as one of the top midfielders in the K League.

Dijon
In January 2017, Kwon joined Dijon on a 3.5-year deal. The transfer fee paid to Suwon was estimated at €1.5 million. In the 2017–18 Ligue 1, Kwon quickly established himself as an ace player for Dijon, finishing joint Dijon's top scorer with 11 goals in 34 league appearances. However, he injured his Achilles tendon during the last league match, and failed to show his former performance since then.

SC Freiburg
On 28 June 2019, Kwon joined Bundesliga side SC Freiburg for the 2019–20 season.

International career
Kwon was named in South Korean under-19 squad for the 2012 AFC U-19 Championship in the United Arab Emirates. After winning the AFC Championship, Kwon was called up to under-20 team for the 2013 FIFA U-20 World Cup.

Kwon was called up to the senior national team for the 2015 East Asian Cup. He made his international debut in an East Asian Cup match against China. On 3 September 2015, at the Hwaseong Stadium, he scored his first senior goals, a brace, in an 8–0 home win over Laos in the second round of qualification for the 2018 FIFA World Cup.

Kwon paticipated in the 2016 Summer Olympics, and scored a crucial goal in a 1–0 win over Mexico to advance to the quarter-finals.

Kwon was named in South Korea's preliminary 28-man squad for the 2018 World Cup in Russia. In the last game of the 2017–18 French season, however, Kwon injured his Achilles tendon and was ruled out for the World Cup through injury.

Career statistics

Club

International
Scores and results list South Korea's goal tally first, score column indicates score after each Kwon goal.

Honours
Suwon Samsung Bluewings
 Korean FA Cup: 2016

South Korea U20
AFC U-19 Championship: 2012

	South Korea U23
AFC U-23 Championship runner-up: 2016

South Korea
EAFF Championship: 2015

Individual
K League 1 Best XI: 2015, 2016

Notes

References

External links
 Kwon Chang-hoon at KFA 
 
 
 Official page of Kwon Chang-hoon

1994 births
Living people
People from Seoul
South Korean footballers
Footballers from Seoul
Association football midfielders
South Korea under-17 international footballers
South Korea under-20 international footballers
South Korea under-23 international footballers
South Korea international footballers
Olympic footballers of South Korea
Footballers at the 2016 Summer Olympics
Footballers at the 2020 Summer Olympics
Suwon Samsung Bluewings players
Dijon FCO players
SC Freiburg players
K League 1 players
Ligue 1 players
Bundesliga players
South Korean expatriate footballers
South Korean expatriate sportspeople in France
Expatriate footballers in France
South Korean expatriate sportspeople in Germany
Expatriate footballers in Germany
2022 FIFA World Cup players